A leap of faith, in its most commonly used meaning, is the act of believing in or accepting something not on the basis of reason. The lack of applying reason might be because the thing being believed or accepted lies outside the boundaries of reason.

Overview

The phrase is commonly attributed to Søren Kierkegaard; however, he never used the term, as he referred to a qualitative leap. A leap of faith according to Kierkegaard involves circularity insofar as the leap is made by faith. In his book Concluding Unscientific Postscript, he describes the core part of the leap of faith: the leap. “Thinking can turn toward itself in order to think about itself and skepticism can emerge. But this thinking about itself never accomplishes anything.” Kierkegaard says thinking should serve by thinking something. Kierkegaard wants to stop "thinking's self-reflection" and that is the movement that constitutes a leap. He is against people's thinking about religion all day without ever doing anything; but he is also against external shows and opinions about religion. Instead, Kierkegaard is in favor of the internal movement of faith. He says, "where Christianity wants to have inwardness, worldly Christendom wants outwardness, and where Christianity wants outwardness, worldly Christendom wants inwardness." But, on the other hand, he also says: "The less externality, the more inwardness if it is truly there; but it is also the case that the less externality, the greater the possibility that the inwardness will entirely fail to come. The externality is the watchman who awakens the sleeper; the externality is the solicitous mother who calls one; the externality is the roll call that brings the soldier to his feet; the externality is the reveille that helps one to make the great effort; but the absence of the externality can mean that the inwardness itself calls inwardly to a person - alas - but it can also mean that the inwardness will fail to come." The "most dreadful thing of all is a personal existence that cannot coalesce in a conclusion," according to Kierkegaard. He asked his contemporaries if any of them had reached a conclusion about anything or did every new premise change their convictions.

David F. Swenson described the leap in his 1916 article The Anti-Intellectualism of Kierkegaard using some of Kierkegaard's ideas. 

This is how the leap was described in 1950 and then in 1960.

The leap into sin and into faith
Kierkegaard describes "the leap" using the famous story of Adam and Eve, particularly Adam's qualitative leap into sin. Adam's leap signifies a change from one quality to another, mainly the quality of possessing no sin to the quality of possessing sin. Kierkegaard maintains that the transition from one quality to another can take place only by a "leap". When the transition happens, one moves directly from one state to the other, never possessing both qualities. "The moment is related to the transition of the one to the many, of the many to the one, of likeness to unlikeness, and that it is the moment in which there is neither one nor many, neither a being determined nor a being combined." "In the Moment man becomes conscious that he is born; for his antecedent state, to which he may not cling, was one of non-being. In the Moment man also becomes conscious of the new birth, for his antecedent state was one of non-being."

Kierkegaard felt that a leap of faith was vital in accepting Christianity due to the paradoxes that exist in Christianity. In his books, Philosophical Fragments and Concluding Unscientific Postscript, Kierkegaard delves deeply into the paradoxes that Christianity presents. Moses Mendelssohn did the same thing when Johann Kaspar Lavater demanded he discuss why he didn't want to become a Christian. Both Kierkegaard and Mendelssohn knew the difficulties involved when discussing religious topics: "As I so sedulously sought to avoid an explanation in my own apartment amidst a small number of worthy men, of whose good intentions I had every reason to be persuaded, it might have been reasonably inferred that a public one would be extremely repugnant to my disposition; and that I must have inevitably become the more embarrassed when the voice demanding it happened to be entitled to an answer at any rate."

Kierkegaard's use of the term "leap" was in response to "Lessing's Ditch" which was discussed by Gotthold Ephraim Lessing (1729–1781) in his theological writings. Kierkegaard was indebted to Lessing's writings in many ways. Lessing tried to battle rational Christianity directly and, when that failed, he battled it indirectly through, what Kierkegaard called, "imaginary constructions". Both may be indebted to Jean-Jacques Rousseau.

Rousseau used the idea in his 1762 book Emile like this: 

Immanuel Kant (1724–1804) used the term in his 1784 essay, Answering the Question: What is Enlightenment? Kant wrote: 

Lessing said, "accidental truths of history can never become the proof of necessary truths of reason." Kierkegaard points out that he also said, "contingent truths of history can never become the demonstrations of necessary truths of reason." Kierkegaard liked Lessing because he "had a most uncommon gift of explaining what he himself had understood. With that he stopped; in our day people go further and explain more than they themselves have understood." 

Kierkegaard has Don Juan in Either/Or escort young girls "all in the dangerous age of being neither grown-up nor children" to "the other side of the ditch of life" as he, himself, "dances over the abyss" only to "instantly sink down into the depths." He has Don Juan "preach the gospel of pleasure" to Elvira and seduces her from the convent and wonders if there is a priest who can "preach the gospel of repentance and remorse" with the same power as Don Juan preached his gospel. Both Lessing and Kierkegaard are discussing the agency one might use to base one's faith upon. Does history provide all the proofs necessary to cross that "ugly, broad ditch"? Or is there "no direct and immediate transition to Christianity". Does one become a Christian "in the fulness of time" as Kierkegaard puts it or is "there only one proof of spirit and that is the spirit’s proof within oneself. Whoever demands something else may get proofs in superabundance, but he is already characterized at spiritless."

He also writes about this in his Concluding Unscientific Postscript: 

The implication of taking a leap of faith can, depending on the context, carry positive or negative connotations, as some feel it is a virtue to be able to believe in something without evidence while others feel it is foolishness. It is a hotly contested theological and philosophical concept. For instance, the association between "blind faith" and religion is disputed by those with deistic principles who argue that reason and logic, rather than revelation or tradition, should be the basis of the belief "that God has existed in human form, was born and grew up". Jesus is the "paradox", the "absolute paradox". When Christianity becomes a scholarly enterprise one tends to "reflect oneself into Christianity" but Kierkegaard says, one should "reflect oneself out of something else and become, more and more simply, a Christian."

Kierkegaard was concerned that individuals would spend all their lives trying to define Christianity, love, God, the Trinity, sin, et cetera, and never get to the business of "actually" making a decision in time to become a Christian who could then act on the basis of that decision. He discussed the inner and the outer relationship existing in belief. "Compared with the Hegelian notion that the outer is the inner and the inner the outer, it certainly is extremely original. But it would be even more original if the Hegelian axiom were not only admired by the present age but also had retroactive power to abolish, backward historically, the distinction between the visible and invisible Church. The invisible Church is not a historical phenomenon; as such it cannot be observed objectively at all, because it is only in subjectivity." There has to be a balance between objective and subjective knowledge. Hegel went to the extreme objective side so Kierkegaard decided to go to the extreme subjective side.

Even some theistic realms of thought do not agree with the implications that this phrase carries. For instance, C. S. Lewis argues against the idea that Christianity requires a "leap of faith," (as the term is most commonly understood). One of Lewis' arguments is that supernaturalism, a basic tenet of Christianity, can be logically inferred based on a teleological argument regarding the source of human reason. Nonetheless, some Christians are less critical of the term and do accept that religion requires a "leap of faith".

What is often missed is that Kierkegaard himself was an orthodox, Scandinavian Lutheran in conflict with the liberal theological establishment of his day. His works built on one another and culminated with the orthodox Lutheran conception of a God that unconditionally accepts man, faith itself being a gift from God, and that the highest moral position is reached when a person realizes this and, no longer depending upon her or himself, takes the leap of faith into the arms of a loving God. In a Lutheran context, the leap of faith becomes much clearer.

Jacobi, Hegel, and C.S. Lewis wrote about Christianity in accordance with their understanding but Kierkegaard didn't want to do that. He felt that it was too dangerous to put in writing what was most holy to himself. He said, "Not even what I am writing here is my innermost meaning. I cannot entrust myself to paper in that way, even though I see it in what is written. Think what could happen! The paper could disappear; there could be a fire where I live and I could live in uncertainty about whether it was burned or still existed; I could die and thus leave it behind me; I could lose my mind and my innermost being could be in alien hands; I could go blind and not be able to find it myself, not know whether I stood with it in my hands without asking someone else, not know whether he lied, whether he was reading what was written there or something else in order to sound me out." Kierkegaard was of the opinion that faith is something different from other things: unexplainable and inexplicable. The more a person tries to explain personal faith to another, the more entangled that person becomes in language and semantics but "recollection"  is "das Zugleich, the all-at-once," that always brings him back to himself.

The appropriation of faith
Kierkegaard stuck to his concept of Christianity as an inner struggle where the single individual stands before God rather than before others. Because standing before God is where the decisive struggle occurs for each single individual. Each single individual who has an "interest" in becoming a Christian has a God-relationship which is different from any other individual. The more we look to "others" for our God-relationship, the more we have a simulated, mediated relationship with an idea. The idea, or ideal, isn't the highest. But getting the idea off the paper or the drawing board and putting it to use in life is the absolute for the Christian.  In Works of Love (1847) he wrote, "Love for the neighbor does not want to be sung about, it wants to be accomplished." He put it this way in Three Discourses on Imagined Occasions (1845), in Concluding Unscientific Postscript (1846), in Works of Love (1847), and in Sickness Unto Death (1849).

Kierkegaard, Goethe, Marx, and Tolstoy 
Kierkegaard questioned how a person changes. Some, like Hegel and Goethe, believed that an external event was required for a new epoch to begin. Kierkegaard disagreed because something might never happen in an external way that would cause a person to change and a possibility for a better life might be lost.  Marx followed after Hegel and Goethe but Tolstoy agreed more with Kierkegaard in his "view of life".

Goethe may have been mocking the idea that the birth of Christ was what made him important or he may have seriously thought that his, Goethe's, own birth made him important.  Kierkegaard didn't believe that Christ had this "upside-downness that wanted to reap before it sowed or this kind of cowardliness that wanted to have certainty before it began." Goethe began his autobiography with the certainty that his life was going to have a great effect on the world stage.

Within the first twenty pages of his autobiography Goethe had pointed to the 1755 Lisbon earthquake as another great life changing event in his life. Goethe's book was translated Truth and Poetry but was also translated Truth and Fiction.  Both authors seemed to be against having a fictional existence. Goethe believed the existence of Christ was being fictionalized while Kierkegaard believed the existence Goethe wrote about in his own autobiography was fictional – and much of it was.

Count Leo Tolstoy said he found out "there was no God" in 1838 when he was 12 years old. He had to work through this idea for the next 38 years until he could come away with a method by which he could believe, not only in God but in Christ. Kierkegaard heard the same from Hegelian philosophers and worked through his doubt to belief but he opposed that method. His thought was to start with faith and proceed forward making positive steps rather than always falling back to start over after doubt had prevailed. He said, "False doubt doubts everything except itself; with the help of faith, the doubt that saves doubts only itself."

Kierkegaard didn't want to argue about his faith any more than he wanted to argue about why he may or may not get married or become a professor. He just wanted to make the movement from "possibility to actuality" and knew that he would just be wasting time if he tried to explain himself.I think that, just as a Christian always ought to be able to explain his faith, so also a married man ought to be able to explain his marriage, not simply to anyone who deigns to ask, but to anyone he thinks worthy of it, or even if, as in this case, unworthy, he finds it propitious to do so.Tolstoy tried to explain the method he used to come to grips with the Christian religion. He acted on his beliefs by freeing his serfs, writing books to help them learn to read and giving them land to farm and live on. He didn't argue and reason with his neighbors; he just did what he set out to do.

Karl Marx complained about Hegelian philosophers in Theses on Feuerbach in this way, "The philosophers have only interpreted the world, in various ways: the point, however, is to change it." Walter Kaufmann changed the quote to reflect the Kierkegaardian difference in his 1959 book, From Shakespeare to Existentialism: His [Kierkegaard's] relation to philosophy is best expressed by changing one small word in Marx's famous dictum: "The philosophers have only interpreted the world, in various ways: the point, however, is to change"-not "it," as Marx said, but ourselves." p. 202. Tolstoy said the same thing: "There can be only one permanent revolution — a moral one; the regeneration of the inner man. How is this revolution to take place? Nobody knows how it will take place in humanity, but every man feels it clearly in himself. And yet in our world everybody thinks of changing humanity, and nobody thinks of changing himself." Only in changing oneself is one equal with another, according to Kierkegaard because, in Christianity, all are equal before God. The world is too abstract to change; but the single individual, you yourself: that is something concrete. Kierkegaard put it this way in his Upbuilding Discourses of 1843–1844 and in his Upbuilding Discourses in Various Spirits of 1847: 

The idea behind world history and constant quantification dehumanizes the quality known as the single individual and can produce "soul rot due to the monotony of self-concern and self-preoccupation" with anxiety about where you fit within the system. Language comes to the aid with copious quantities of words to explain everything. But Kierkegaard says: "the pathos of the ethical is to act."

You are the one

Kierkegaard started out, in Either/Or Part I, by saying, "You know how the prophet Nathan dealt with King David when he presumed to understand the parable the prophet had told him but was unwilling to understand that it applied to him. Then to make sure, Nathan added: You are the man, O King. In the same way I also have continually tried to remind you that you are the one who is being discussed and you are the one who is spoken to.” He discussed this again in another way in Either/Or Part II where he begins: "The esthetic view also considers the personality in relation to the surrounding world, and the expression for this is in its recurrence in the personality of enjoyment. But the esthetic expression for enjoyment in its relation to the personality is mood. That is, the personality is present in the mood, but it is dimly present. ... The mood of the person who lives ethically is centralized. He is not in the mood, and he is not mood, but he has mood and has the mood within himself. What he works for is continuity, and this is always the master of mood. His life does not lack mood-indeed, it has a total mood. But this is acquired; it is what would be called aequale tempermentum [even disposition]. But this is no esthetic mood, and no person has it by nature or immediately." Later, in 1845, he repeated the same point in Stages on Life's Way with a story about an individual with an addiction to gambling and another individual who was a gambler but wasn't in despair because of it:  

Throughout his writings Kierkegaard reiterated his emphasis on the single individual learning how to make a resolution. One example is the following prayer from his April 26, 1848 book Christian Discourses.

Notes

References

Bibliography
 
 —
 —
 
 
 —
 
 
 
 
 
 
 
 
 
 
 
 
 
 .

External links
 Gotthold Lessing, Lessing's Theological Writings, Selections in Translation Stanford University Press, Jun 1, 1957
 Center on Capitalism & Society 200 Anniversary of Soren Kierkegaard Leap of Faith (Video)
 Jack Crabtree (Gutenberg College, Eugene Oregon) Explaining Kierkegaard
 Marx and Kierkegaard, Sea of Faith, 1984 BBC documentary YouTube Video
 From the Aesthetic to the Leap of Faith: Søren Kierkegaard YouTube video

Barriers to critical thinking
Belief
Concepts in epistemology
Concepts in logic
Concepts in the philosophy of mind
Christian personal development
Criticism of rationalism
Søren Kierkegaard